Scott Olin Wright (January 15, 1923 – July 11, 2016) was a United States district judge of the United States District Court for the Western District of Missouri.

Education and career

Wright was born in Haigler, Nebraska. During World War II, he was a cadet in the United States Navy from 1942 to 1943, and then a United States Marine Corps Captain and Aviator from 1943 to 1946. Following the war, Wright received a Bachelor of Laws from University of Missouri School of Law in Columbia, Missouri in 1950. He was in private practice in Columbia from 1950 to 1954, and was a city attorney for Columbia from 1951 to 1953. From 1954 to 1958, he was a prosecutor for Boone County, Missouri, then returned to private practice in Columbia until 1979.

Federal judicial service

On May 24, 1979, Wright was nominated by President Jimmy Carter to a new seat on the United States District Court for the Western District of Missouri created by Congress. He was confirmed by the United States Senate on September 25, 1979, and received his commission the following day. He served as Chief Judge of the district from 1985 to 1990, and assumed senior status on October 5, 1991, serving in that status until his death on July 11, 2016, in Kansas City, Missouri.

References

Sources
 

1923 births
2016 deaths
Judges of the United States District Court for the Western District of Missouri
United States district court judges appointed by Jimmy Carter
20th-century American judges
People from Dundy County, Nebraska
Military personnel from Nebraska
United States Marine Corps personnel of World War II
University of Missouri School of Law alumni
United States Marine Corps officers